Rhododendron niveum is a rhododendron species native to northeastern India (including Sikkim), Bhutan, and southern Tibet in China, where it grows at altitudes of . When young the leaves are covered in a white indumentum, which falls off the upper surface but remains on the underside. The flowers are an intense magenta or lilac, and held in a compact ball above the leaves.

Cultural depictions
Rhododendron niveum is the state tree of the Indian state of Sikkim.

References

External links

niveum
Flora of China
National symbols of Sikkim
Flora of East Himalaya
Flora of Tibet